Lloyd Park may refer to:
 Lloyd Park, Croydon, a park on the outskirts of Croydon, England (also known as Lloyd Country Park).
 Lloyd Park in the grounds of the William Morris Gallery in Walthamstow.